Mount Constitution is a mountain on Orcas Island, the highest point in the San Juan Islands and the second highest mountain on an ocean island in the contiguous 48 states. Only Devils Peak in the Channel Islands of California is higher.

A stone observation tower patterned after a medieval watch tower stands at the summit. It was designed by architect Ellsworth Storey and built by the Civilian Conservation Corps in 1936. The tower offers panoramic views of the surrounding islands, the Cascade Mountains, and many Canadian and American cities. On a clear day, the view encompasses locations as diverse as Mount Baker, Mount Rainier, Saturna Island, and the cities of Vancouver, and Victoria, British Columbia. Mount Constitution lies within the  Moran State Park.

References

External links

 
 

Constitution, Mount
Mountains of San Juan County, Washington